Mariafe Artacho del Solar (born 24 October 1993) is an Australian beach volleyball player. She represented Australia at the 2016 Summer Olympics in Rio de Janeiro and the 2020 Summer Olympics in Tokyo in 2021. Artacho del Solar plays as a right-side defender. According to the Women's FIVB World Rankings, she and partner Taliqua Clancy are ranked 5th as of 21 January 2020.

Early life
Artacho del Solar moved with her mother from Lima, Peru, to Sydney when she was 11 years old. They joined her older brother and extended family already living there. She spoke limited English and found that sport was the best way to communicate. She attended Gordon West Public School before she attended Killara High School, where she met her future Rio Olympics Beach Volleyball partner Nicole Laird.

Artacho del Solar was then offered an AIS Scholarship with the Beach Volleyball program in 2012 which saw her move to Adelaide, South Australia in which the Australian Beach Volleyball Program is located.

Professional career

Rio de Janeiro – 2016 Olympics
Artacho del Solar made her Olympic debut at the 2016 Summer Olympics in Rio de Janeiro with then partner Nicole Laird. The pair did not win a match in Rio, losing to the US, Switzerland and China in their preliminary pool matches to finish the tournament in 19th place.

Gold Coast – 2018 Commonwealth Games
Artacho del Solar participated in the 2018 Commonwealth Games on the Gold Coast with partner Taliqua Clancy. The duo won their 3 preliminary pool matches without losing a set, with wins over Cyprus' Manolina Konstantinou and Mariota Angelopoulou (21–14, 21–9), Grenada's Renisha Stafford and Thornia Williams (21–2, 21–11), and Scotland's Lynne Beattie and Melissa Coutts (21–9, 21–9). Finishing top of their pool, they advanced to the quarter-finals, where they defeated Rwanda's Charlotte Nzayisenga and Denyse Mutatsimpundu (21–9, 21–8) to advance to the semi-finals. After winning the opening set of their semi-final against Vanuatu's pairing of Linline Matauatu and Miller Pata, the duo lost their first set of the tournament to send the match to the decider, which they won to advance to the gold medal match (21–19, 16–21, 15–9). At the gold medal match, the duo lost to Canada's Melissa Humana-Paredes and Sarah Pavan (19–21, 20–22) to take home the silver medal.

FIVB World Tour 2019
Artacho del Solar and Clancy are currently competing on the FIVB World Tour around the world. The pair have already won a Bronze in Xiamen, China and Gold in the Asian Beach Volleyball Championships at Maoming. They competed at the 2019 Beach Volleyball World Championships in Hamburg, Germany, from 28 June to 7 July, winning bronze. Due to an injury to Artacho del Solar's left knee, the pair had three months off before competing again towards the end of 2019 in which they won gold at the 4-star double gender in Chetumal, Mexico.

Tokyo – 2020 Olympics 
On August 4, 2021, Artacho del Solar and partner Taliqua Clancy upset the world number-one team of Canada in the quarter finals. On August 5, 2021, they defeated the Latvian team with a convincing straight-sets win to advance to the gold-medal match against the United States.  They lost to the U.S. in the finals, and took the silver medal.

Coaching 
From August to October 2021, Artacho del Solar was coaching Year 10 high-school volleyball at Ormiston College in Brisbane, Australia.

Personal life
Artacho Del Solar is married to Jack Curtin, with their wedding taking place at a registry in November 2020.

References

External links
 
 
 
 
 
 
 

1993 births
Living people
Australian women's beach volleyball players
Peruvian emigrants to Australia
Australian people of Peruvian descent
Beach volleyball players at the 2016 Summer Olympics
Olympic beach volleyball players of Australia
Beach volleyball players at the 2018 Commonwealth Games
Beach volleyball defenders
Sportspeople from Lima
Commonwealth Games competitors for Australia
Beach volleyball players at the 2020 Summer Olympics
Olympic silver medalists for Australia
Medalists at the 2020 Summer Olympics
Olympic medalists in beach volleyball
Commonwealth Games silver medallists for Australia
Naturalised citizens of Australia
Beach volleyball players at the 2022 Commonwealth Games
Medallists at the 2022 Commonwealth Games